Afroditi and its variant Aphrodite are given names. People with the name include:

People
 Afroditi Frida (born 1964), Greek singer
 Aphrodite Jones (born 1958), American author, reporter, and television producer
 Afroditi Kosma (born 1983), Greek basketball player
 Afroditi Krassa (born 1974), Greek-British designer
 Aphrodite Liti (born 1953), Greek sculptor and academic
 Afroditi Grigoriadou (1937–2020), Greek actress
 Afroditi Laoutari (1893–1975), Greek singer and musical theatre actress
 Afroditi Skafida (born 1982), Greek pole vaulter
 Afroditi Theopeftatou (born 1957), Greek civil engineer and politician

Compund name
 Olga-Afroditi Pilaki (born 1989), Greek rhythmic gymnast

Fictional characters
 Aphrodite (Xena and Hercules), from the TV shows Xena: Warrior Princess and Hercules: The Legendary Journeys
 Aphrodite (comics), various characters
 Aphrodite A, a female mecha from the Mazinger Z anime and manga series
 Aphrodite Aperyi, a character on the ANT1 television series Erotas
 Pisces Aphrodite, in the Saint Seiya manga series
 Aphrodite,  a playable character in Smite (video game)
 Aphrodite ('Afy') Hallijohn, fictional character in the novel East Lynne, by Ellen Wood, the 1913 film East Lynne, and other adaptations of the story

See also
 Aphrodite (disambiguation)

Greek feminine given names